A Day at the Museum is a 2008 French ensemble comedy film directed by Jean-Michel Ribes.

Plot
The museum seen as a microcosm. This is both a theater, with its stage and behind the scenes, and an anthill with his queen (Conservative), his soldiers (guards) her workers (handlers) and aphids (visitors).

Cast

References

External links

2008 films
2008 comedy films
French comedy films
2000s French-language films
2000s French films